John Prindle Scott (August 16, 1877 in Norwich, New York – December 2, 1932 in Syracuse, New York) was an American author, lecturer, educator and composer of art songs.

Biography
He was born in Norwich, New York, and was educated with private tutors in New York city and at Oberlin College in Ohio, where he was enrolled as a music student from 1896–1900, and moved to New York city before 1908.  Later he was a voice teacher in Saginaw, Michigan. He was also known as a singer (baritone) and concert soloist. According to an article in the Syracuse American, "He had established a considerable reputation in concert work when he was forced by increasing deafness to turn to composition for musical expression."

For his 1916 setting of "Hymn to Nebraska," the state of Nebraska awarded him a prize in composition. He also won a composition prize from Ohio University.  He became a member of ASCAP in 1928.

He spent a few summers in McDonough, New York, before purchasing a house there in 1922, calling his home "The Scottage".  A couple of his songs and poems refer to the town, including "The Old Road" and "The Hills O' McDonough".

He spent time with relatives in Syracuse, New York, where he died in December 1932

Music
John Prindle Scott composed about 60 published songs between 1910 and 1930, including several prominent sacred works which have remained in the repertoire, especially "Come, Ye Blessed."  Alan J. Ord mentioned "Come, Ye Blessed" as a good song for bass voices, calling it "ardent, with a flowing line". Scott's song for high soprano, "The Wind's in the South", is considered a "good teaching piece for young coloratura [sopranos]".  His songs are typical of their time: dramatic, harmonically rich, and with full accompaniments.  They often feature contrasting sections and a return to earlier musical material.

Musical compositions

Sacred Songs for voice and piano
Arise, Shine, Sacred Song (Biblical Book of Isaiah), R. L. Huntzinger, 1923
Christ Is Risen, Easter Song (unknown author), Harold Flammer, 1920
Come, Ye Blessed (Biblical Gospel of Matthew), G. Schirmer, 1917
Consider the Lilies (Biblical Gospel of Matthew), G. Schirmer, 1921
Death Triumphant (text by the composer), R. L. Huntzinger, 1922
Depart from Me, sacred song (unknown author), Harold Flammer, 1919
The First Easter Morn (based on biblical Luke 24), hymn tune by Charles Wesley, G. Schirmer, 1923
Following the Star, a Christmas Song (unknown author), G. Schirmer, 1919
God of Our Fathers (D. Roberts), Harold Flammer, 1917
He Maketh Wars to Cease (Biblical Psalm 46), Harold Flammer, 1918
He Shall Give His Angels Charge (Biblical Psalm 103), R. L. Huntzinger, 1918
I know in Whom I have Believed (Biblical books of Second Timothy and Malachi), W. Maxwell Music Co, 1913, Theodore Presser, 1920
If Ye Love Me John 14), R. L. Huntzinger, 1922
Jerusalem the Golden (unknown author), Harold Flammer, 1918
Light's Glittering Morn, Easter Solo (unknown author), G. Schirmer, 1921
Like as a Father (Biblical Psalm 91), G. Schirmer, 1922
The Lord is My Shepherd (Biblical Psalm 23), G. Schirmer, 1922
Out of the Depths (Biblical Psalm 130), R. L. Huntzinger, 1918
The Promised Land (unknown author), R. L. Huntzinger, 1919
Repent Ye (Biblical Matthew 3: 1,2,7,8,11,12), G. Schirmer, 1917
The Revelation (unknown author), Theodore Presser, 1918
Ride On! Ride On! A sacred song (unknown author), Theodore Presser, 1918
There is a Land of Pure Delight (Isaac Watts), Flammer, 1919
They that Trust in the Lord (unknown author), G. Schirmer, 1921
Three Sacred Songs, Harold Flammer, 1918
Remember Now Thy Creator (unknown author)
The Messenger of Peace (unknown author)
Come, Ye Thankful People Come (unknown author)
Sun of My Soul (Hymn text by J. Keble), Harold Flammer, 1918
The Trumpet Shall Sound (unknown author), Harold Flammer, 1921
Trust Ye in the Lord (Biblical Book of Isaiah), Huntzinger & Dilworth/Willis Music, 1917
Two Sacred Songs, Huntzinger & Dilworth/Willis Music, 1921
When I Consider the Heavens (Biblical Psalm 8)
Even Song (Rev. A. P. Upperby), with violin obbligato
The Voice in the Wilderness (Biblical Book of Isaiah), Huntzinger & Dilworth/Willis Music, 1916

Secular Songs for voice and piano
At the Donnybrook Fair (unknown author), Theodore Presser, 1916
The Dearest Place (Claire Wallace Flynn), Huntzinger & Dilworth, 1918
The False Prophet, or The Lying Little Daisy (Reginald V. Darow), R. L. Huntzinger/Willis Music, 1922
Good Luck, Mister Fisherman (text by the composer), R. L. Huntzinger, 1922
Green, An Irish Song (M. E. Blake), G. Schirmer, 1923
Holiday (text by the composer), G. Schirmer, 1922
In Canturbury Square (Reginald V. Darow), Theodore Presser, 1923
John O'Dreams (T. Garrison), W. Maxwell Music Co, 1913
Love is a Riddle (text by the composer), R. L. Huntzinger, 1928
My True Love Lies Asleep (Lizette Woodworth Reese), Theodore Presser, 1915
Old Bill Bluff (text by the composer), Huntzinger & Dilworth, 1917
The Old Road: Song of Wandering (Reginald V. Darow), G. Schirmer, 1920
Romeo in Georgia (text by the composer), Huntzinger & Dilworth, 1919
A Sailor's Love Song (text by the composer), W. Maxwell Music Co, 1912
The Secret (Robert Fullerton), John Church Co., 1910
The Shadows of the Evening Hours
The Spray o' Heather (Stephen Chalmers), G. Schirmer, 1921
To an Old Love (text by the composer), G. Schirmer, 1919[16]
Trelawny (R. S. Hawker), Theodore Presser, 1917
Two Songs, G. Schirmer, 1921
One Gave Me a Rose (unknown author)
The Maid of Japan (Reginald V. Darow)
Virginia: Waltz Ballad (Dorothy E. Borchers), Los Angeles: W.A. Quincke & Co., 1932
The Wind's in the South (text by the composer), Huntzinger & Dilworth/Willis Music, 1916
Young Alan the Piper (unknown author), Theodore Presser, 1917

Songs for voice and organ
Light, A Sacred Song (text by the composer), G. Schirmer, 1919
The Promised Land (unknown author), Huntzinger & Dilworth, 1919
There were Shepherds, Christmas song (Luke 2:8–15), Harold Flammer, 1917

Piano solo
Two Irish Sketches, Theodore Presser, 1916–17, published 1918
The top o' the Mornin' (also arranged for piano duet)
At the Donnybrook Fair (also arranged for piano duet)
Dennis and Norah (Irish Sketches, no. 3), Theodore Presser, 1917

Other works
Angels, Roll the Rock Away, Easter anthem for mixed voices and soprano or tenor solo, R. L. Huntzinger, 1930
Even Song, voice, violin, and piano (Rev. A. P. Upperby), see Two Sacred Songs above
Five Oberlin Songs, 1906
He Maketh Wars to Cease, SAB chorus and organ, arr. Wallingford Riegger (Biblical Psalm 46), Harold Flammer, 1944
Nocturne, medium voice, violin, 'cello, and piano, G. Schirmer, 1920
O Haste the Day when Wars Shall Cease!, a hymn (text by Rev. A. A. Toms, Harold Flammer, 1918
O Little Town of Bethlehem, Christmas song, voice, violin, and piano (text "from the Hymnal"), Harold Flammer, 1920
Romeo in Georgia, male voices, R. L. Huntzinger/Willis Music, 1938
School songs for Ohio University
Two school songs for Lincoln College, "Evening Hymn" and "Won't You Come Along?", 1920?
The Voice in the Wilderness, mixed voices and organ, R. L. Huntzinger/Willis Music, 1928
The Wind's in the South, SSA, R. L. Huntzinger/Willis Music, 1929

Footnotes

References

External links
 Victor discography of songs by John Prindle Scott made between 1920 and 1928
 A few of the texts set to music by John Prindle Scott
 A 1921 Victor recording of Scott's song "The Old Road" with instrumental ensemble, Merle Alcock, contralto, Josef Pasternack, conductor

Songwriters from New York (state)
1877 births
1932 deaths
Musicians from Syracuse, New York
Musicians from New York City
Oberlin College alumni